East of Eden is the second studio album by Taken by Trees, the solo project of Swedish musician Victoria Bergsman. The album was released on 7 September 2009 by Rough Trade Records. Bergsman travelled to Pakistan to record the album, and several of the album's songs incorporate influences from Pakistani music.

The song "My Boys" is a cover of the Animal Collective song "My Girls" with some minor lyric changes. The song "Anna" also features Animal Collective member Noah "Panda Bear" Lennox on backing vocals. The song "To Lose Someone" features the voice of local Sufi musician Sain Muhammad Ali.

Track listing

Charts

References

2009 albums
Taken by Trees albums